Happy Few is a 2010 French romance film directed by Antony Cordier. The film was nominated for the Golden Lion at the 67th Venice International Film Festival.  It was released in the US under the title Four Lovers by Oscilloscope Laboratories in theaters and on DVD in 2012. In Europe on DVD it was released as Aimez Qui Vous Voulez - Happy Few.

Cast
 Marina Foïs as Rachel
 Roschdy Zem as Franck
 Élodie Bouchez as Teri
 Nicolas Duvauchelle as Vincent
 Jean-François Stévenin as Rachel's father
 Blanche Gardin as Rachel's sister
 Alexia Stresi as Diane
 Geneviève Mnich as Franck's mother
 Philippe Paimblanc as Franck's father
 Ilona Caly as Thelma
 Naomi Ferreira as Margot
 Ferdinand Ledoux as Tim

References

External links
 

2010 films
2010 romance films
2010s French-language films
French romance films
2010s French films